The Leader of the Christian Democratic Appeal is the most senior politician within the Christian Democratic Appeal (CDA) in the Netherlands.The current leader has been Wopke Hoekstra since 10 December 2020.

History
The leaders outwardly act as the figurehead and the main representative of the party. Within the party, they must ensure political consensus. At election time the Leader is always the lijsttrekker (top candidate) of the party list. Outside election time the officeholder can serve as the Leader of the Opposition. In the Christian Democratic Appeal the Leader is often the Parliamentary leader in the House of Representatives. Some Christian Democratic Appeal leaders became a Minister in a Cabinet.

Deputy Leader
The Christian Democratic Appeal doesn't have an official designated Deputy Leader in the party's hierarchy but some are given the title as an unofficial description by the media. Because of the often unofficial nature of the position, reliable sources can sometimes differ over who the deputy actually is or was.

See also
 Christian Democratic Appeal

References

External links
Official

  

 
 
Christian Democratic Appeal
Netherlands politics-related lists